Tony Ferreira (Florianópolis, 1943 — Rio de Janeiro, 1994), was a Brazilian actor.

Tony died in 1994, from sepsis, in Rio de Janeiro.

Filmography

Telenovelas 
1988 Olho por Olho (Rede Manchete) - Secretary of Justice
1987 Mandala
1985 Um Sonho a Mais - Afonso
1984 Partido Alto - Sheriff
1984 Anjo Maldito (SBT) - Tomás
1982 Final Feliz - Gastão
1981 Baila Comigo - Edmundo
1980 Coração Alado - Jaime
1980 Água Viva - Waldir
1978 Sinal de Alerta - Father Mauro
1977 O Astro - Gilberto
1977 Sem Lenço, Sem Documento - Gouveia
1976 Estúpido Cupido - Fidélis
1975 O Grito - Grandalhão
1975 Escalada - Bruno
1974 Fogo Sobre Terra
1973 Cavalo de Aço
1972 Selva de Pedra - Sheriff

Miniseries 
Planeta dos Homens
1991 O Portador
1990 La Mamma - Luigi Vampa
1987 A Rainha da Vida (Rede Manchete) - Lawyer

Films 
1984 - Amor Maldito
1980 - O Grande Palhaço
1979 - Inquietações de Uma Mulher Casada
1979 - Milagre - O Poder da Fé
1977 - Noite em Chamas
1977 - O Seminarista
1976 - As Mulheres que Dão Certo
1976 - Xica da Silva
1976 - O Ibraim do Subúrbio
1976 - O Monstro de Santa Teresa

Theatre (incomplete list) 
Ópera do Malandro
Mame-o ou Deixe-o
Cabaret S.A.

External links 

1943 births
1994 deaths
People from Florianópolis
Deaths from sepsis
20th-century Brazilian male actors